The County Cricket Ground, known for sponsorship reasons as The 1st Central County Ground, is a cricket venue in Hove, East Sussex, England. The County Ground is the home of Sussex County Cricket Club, where most Sussex home matches since 1872 have been played, although many other grounds in Sussex have been used. Sussex CCC continue to play some of their games away from The County Ground, at either Arundel Castle and Horsham. It is one of the few county grounds to have deckchairs for spectators, in the Sussex CCC colours of blue and white, and was the first cricket ground to install permanent floodlights, for day/night cricket matches and the second ground (after Edgbaston) to host a day/night match in England, in 1997.

Cricket history 
Prior to 1872, Sussex County Cricket Club played their home matches at Royal Brunswick Ground. The land for the County Ground was a barley field until it was bought in 1871. The turf from the Royal Brunswick Ground was then brought to the County Ground, which became the home of Sussex CCC in 1872, and continues to be so.

In 1872, George "Farmer" Bennett became the first batsman in first-class cricket to be given out handled ball during a match between Kent and Sussex at the County Ground. In 1873, Sussex bowled Worcestershire out for 19 at Hove. In 1884–85, the public raised £4,400 towards the purchase of the ground, with the Earl of Sheffield contributing an additional £600. In the 20th century, the ground was used for some other cricket matches, such as a charity match in 1927 between the "Jockeys" and the "Racing Press", in aid of the Royal Sussex County Hospital and the Royal Alexandra Children's Hospital, and an annual match between local commercial travellers and grocers, nicknamed "Travellers v. Grocers"; in 1925, the match was won by the Travellers by 1 run.

The ground has hosted one men's One Day International; the match was part of the 1999 Cricket World Cup, and was a Group A match between South Africa and India, which South Africa won by 4 wickets. The County Ground has also hosted 2 Test matches in The Women's Ashes in 1987 and 2005; in addition, the ground hosted two One Day Internationals in the 2013 Women's Ashes,  As of 2017, 5 Women's ODIs and 4 Women's T20Is have been hosted at the ground.

In 2003, The County Ground was the venue where Sussex won their first County Championship title. In that match, Sussex batsman Murray Goodwin also scored 335*, which was then highest score by a Sussex player in first-class cricket. The ground also saw Sussex win their third Championship title in 2007.

Non-cricket history 

During the 1890s, the County Ground was also used as a football ground for teams from the Brighton Area, including Brighton United of the Southern League (until they went bust in 1900), and Brighton Athletic of the East Sussex League. The ground was also the venue for the Sussex lawn tennis championship meetings in 1893 and 1899, and in 1948, the County Ground also hosted a rugby union match between Brighton and a Midland Bank team.

Many concerts have been held at the County Ground. Elton John has played at the ground in 2006, 2011  and 2019, the ground has also hosted Madness, Lionel Richie (with Shane Filan of Westlife as support act), Little Mix, Olly Murs, Cliff Richard and Rod Stewart. As part of the 2012 Summer Olympics torch relay, the ground hosted an official Olympic torch event.

For many years, the County Ground has hosted one of the best fireworks displays within the South East, for Guy Fawkes Night. In 2019, the annual fireworks night sold out with over 7,500 attendees.

Gallery

Notes

References

See also
 List of cricket grounds in England and Wales
 

Cricket grounds in East Sussex
Sports venues in Brighton and Hove
Sussex County Cricket Club
Sports venues completed in 1872
Hove
1999 Cricket World Cup stadiums